Christof Migone is a Swiss-born  experimental sound artist and writer, formerly based in Montreal, now living in Toronto.

He is assistant professor at the Department of Visual Arts at the University of Western Ontario

Migone's solo recordings include Sound Voice Perform (2006), South Winds (2003), Crackers (2001), Quieting (2000), The Death of Analogies (1999), vex (1998) and Hole in the Head (1996). All of which were recorded on various labels: Avatar, ND, Alien 8, Locust, and Oral.  His writing on audio art has appeared in EAR magazine, Radiotext(e), Radio Rethink, Theater Drama Review, Parachute, Site of Sound: of Architecture and the Ear, Experimental Sound and Radio edited by Allen S. Weiss, Writing Aloud: The Sonics of Language, S:ON Sound in Contemporary Canadian Art edited by Nicole Gingras, and Aural Cultures edited by Jim Drobnick. In Sonic Somatic: Performances of the Unsound Body, Migone proposed a form of aesthetic sonic philosophy, which explored how sound shapes and disrupts the way art shifted from subject to object through to the abject. 

He was a founding member of the audio based artist-run center Avatar in Quebec City. Avatar releases audio projects by artists under the name Ohm/Avatar.

References

External links
Official site
University of Toronto research profile
Online bio-discography
Reviews for Sound Voice Perform
Blackwood Gallery

Year of birth missing (living people)
Living people
Canadian sound artists
Artists from Montreal
Alien8 Recordings artists
Locust Music artists